The Zabeel Mile, is a horse race run over a distance of 1,600 metres (one mile) on turf in late February or early March at Meydan Racecourse in Dubai. The race is named after a locality in Western Dubai. Not related with New Zealand stallion Zabeel.

It was first contested in 2007 at Nad Al Sheba Racecourse before being transferred to Meydan in 2010.

The Zabeel Mile began as a Listed race. The race was elevated to Group 3 level in 2009 and became a Group 2 event in 2011.

Records
Record time:
1:35.53 - Safety Check 2015

Most successful horse (2 wins):
 Safety Check – 2015, 2016

Most wins by a jockey:
 5 - William Buick 2015, 2016, 2019, 2021, 2023

Most wins by a trainer:
 6 - Charlie Appleby 2015, 2016, 2019, 2020, 2021, 2023

Most wins by an owner:
 9 - Godolphin Racing 2008, 2011, 2012, 2015, 2016, 2019, 2020, 2021, 2023

Winners

See also
 List of United Arab Emirates horse races

References

Racing Post:
, 

Horse races in the United Arab Emirates
Recurring events established in 2007
Nad Al Sheba Racecourse
2007 establishments in the United Arab Emirates